Lieutenant-General Lammert Swart (1847 – The Hague, January 16, 1909) was commander of the Royal Netherlands East Indies Army and Chief of the Department of War in the Dutch East Indies.

Sources
 1909. R. Luitenant generaal Swart. In memoriam. Indisch Militair Tijdschrift. Bladzijde 209-212.

1847 births
1909 deaths
Royal Netherlands East Indies Army generals
Royal Netherlands East Indies Army officers
Aceh War
Knights Third Class of the Military Order of William